The Torneo Internacional Challenger León (formerly known as Challenger Ficrea, presentado por ultra, Torneo Internacional AGT and Abierto Internacional Leon) is a professional tennis tournament played on outdoor hardcourts. It is currently part of the ATP Challenger Tour and the ITF Women's Circuit. It is held annually in León, Mexico, since 2003.

Past finals

Men's singles

Men's doubles

Women's singles

Women's doubles

External links
 Official website

 
ATP Challenger Tour
ITF Women's World Tennis Tour
Hard court tennis tournaments
Tennis tournaments in Mexico
León, Guanajuato
Recurring sporting events established in 2003